The Tyson–Maner House is a historic mansion in Montgomery, Alabama, U.S.. It was built in 1890 for Archibald Pitt Tyson, a former farmer turned real estate developer. It remained in the family until 1930, as it was inherited by his wife Ellen Nicholson Arrington in 1918 and later by their children. By the 1970s, it belonged to Carl Herbert Lancaster, an architect. It has been listed on the National Register of Historic Places since May 10, 1979.

References

Houses on the National Register of Historic Places in Alabama
Victorian architecture in Alabama
Houses completed in 1890
Houses in Montgomery, Alabama
1890 establishments in Alabama